Nikos Christidis (Greek: Νίκος Χρηστίδης; born 18 September 1944) is a Greek former professional footballer who played as a goalkeeper.

Club career
Christidis started his football career in the youth divisions of Aris. In 1961 he was promoted to the first team where he won the Greek cup in 1970. He was for years the club's main goalkeeper, until 1974 when he was accused of bribery in a match against Olympiacos by Aris president, Kampanis. As a result he was released from the club and he was punished with a three-year suspension from all sporting activities by the General Secretariat of Sports and was banned from Aris for life, however many years later he was vindicated. In the summer of 1974, he played in the National Soccer League with Toronto Homer.

In 1976, Loukas Barlos decided to sign him to join AEK Athens. On March 16 of 1977, in a UEFA Cup match against QPR, while the game was at the extra time and was heading in a penalty shoot-out, František Fadrhonc decided to replace his main goalkeeper Lakis Stergioudas with Christidis. His 2 penalty saves sent AEK to the semi-finals of the tournament. He stayed at AEK, where he won the 1978 double, the 1979 championship and finished his career in 1982, when he was 38 years old.

International career
Christidis played for Greece U19 6 times. He was also the main goalkeeper of the squad that competed in the European Championship of 1963.

Christidis made with Greece 26 appearances, between 1964 and 1978, four of which as a captain.

Managerial career
After Christidis ended his playing career and worked for many years as assistant coach and as the goalkeeping coach for AEK. He also worked as a first coach mainly in teams of smaller divisions. He assumed the position of coach initially as an interim on April 26, 1987 when a two-month exclusion sentence was imposed on Nikos Alefantos, who was the coach of AEK at that time. But when Alefantos was fired and Christidis took over until the end of the season. In 1996 he was in charge of infrastructure departments at AEK. In 1998 he worked as an assistant to Giannis Kollias in Greece U21 and in 2000 as an assistant to Vasilis Daniil in Greece, while in 2001 he was their first coach, in a friendly match against Russia, before Otto Rehhagel took over the technical leadership.

Honours

Aris
Greek Cup: 1969–1970

AEK Athens
Alpha Ethniki 1977–78, 1978–79
Greek Cup: 1977–1978

References

External links

Footballbase profile

1944 births
Living people
Association football goalkeepers
Greece national football team managers
AEK Athens F.C. players
Greek footballers
Greece international footballers
Aris Thessaloniki F.C. players
Greek football managers
Canadian National Soccer League players
Footballers from Thessaloniki
Association football coaches
Association football goalkeeping coaches
Greek expatriate footballers
Greek expatriate sportspeople in Canada
Expatriate soccer players in Canada